Tatjana Muravjova (born 13 January 1949 in Tallinn) is an Estonian politician. She was a member of X Riigikogu.

References

Living people
1949 births
Estonian Reform Party politicians
Members of the Riigikogu, 2003–2007
Members of the Riigikogu, 2007–2011
Women members of the Riigikogu
Estonian people of Russian descent
Politicians from Tallinn
21st-century Estonian women politicians